The White Pine Range Wilderness is a  wilderness area in southwestern White Pine County, in the U.S. state of Nevada.

Geography
The Wilderness lies within the Humboldt-Toiyabe National Forest and is therefore administered by the U.S. Forest Service.

Bordered by Currant Mountain Wilderness on the south, the White Pine Range Wilderness was created by the White Pine County Conservation, Recreation and Development Act of 2006.  The nearest city is Ely, Nevada.

Habitats
The White Pine Range Wilderness is characterized by rocky canyons and forested alpine hills covered with Abies concolor - white fir, Pinus monophylla - Single-leaf Pinyon, Pinus flexilis - Limber pine, and Pinus longaeva - Great Basin Bristlecone Pines.

See also
 :Category:Flora of the Great Basin
 :Category:Trees of the Great Basin
 List of wilderness areas in Nevada
 List of U.S. Wilderness Areas
 Wilderness Act

References

External links
 Friends of Nevada Wilderness - White Pine Range Wilderness
 "Scientists Voice Their Overwhelming Support for Wilderness Designations in White Pine County, Nevada" by the Wilderness Society

Wilderness areas of Nevada
Protected areas of White Pine County, Nevada
Humboldt–Toiyabe National Forest
Protected areas established in 2006
2006 establishments in Nevada